Van Wert City School District is a public school district serving students in the city of Van Wert, along with Liberty, Pleasant, and Ridge townships in Van Wert County in the U.S. state of Ohio. The school district enrolls 2,082 students as of the 2012–2013 academic year.

Schools

Elementary schools
Van Wert Elementary School (kindergarten through 5th)

Middle schools
Van Wert Middle School (grades 6th through 8th)

High schools
Van Wert High School (grades 9th through 12th)

Other schools
Van Wert Early Childhood Center (kindergarten and preschool)
Kids Learning Place (0-12yrs)
Lifelinks Community School (grades 6th through 12th)

References

External links
Van Wert City School District website

School districts in Ohio
Education in Van Wert County, Ohio